Chan Dara (born 1 March 1986) is a former Cambodian footballer.

Honours

Club
Khemara Keila
Cambodian League: 2006
Hun Sen Cup: 2007
Phnom Penh Crown
Cambodian League: 2010, 2011
Nagaworld
Hun Sen Cup: 2013

References

External links
 

1986 births
Living people
Cambodian footballers
Cambodia international footballers
Place of birth missing (living people)
Association football defenders
Phnom Penh Crown FC players
Nagaworld FC players